A Merry Little Christmas is a Christmas album by American singer/songwriter/producer Linda Ronstadt, released in 2000.  It was the final release under Ronstadt's recording contract with the Elektra/Asylum Records label for whom Linda had recorded since 1973 (twenty-seven years to that point).  John Boylan returned as Linda's producer for this disc. Cover art and design Kosh

It was the biggest-selling Holiday album of the 2000 Christmas season.  It peaked at #179 on Billboard main album chart and continued to sell year in and year out.

Ronstadt and Elektra differed on the final playing order: "They wanted me to start with 'Chestnuts Roasting On An Open Fire'. I was tired of bargaining with them. I had this scheme where it started with ancient and went to modern. I always like to organize chronologically."

Track listing

References

Linda Ronstadt albums
Elektra Records albums
2000 Christmas albums
Christmas albums by American artists
Albums produced by John Boylan (record producer)
Albums produced by George Massenburg
Pop Christmas albums
Covers albums